Area code 564 is a telephone area code in the North American Numbering Plan (NANP) for Western Washington state, including the city of Seattle. The area code serves an overlay for a region that comprises the numbering plan area 360. Other area codes in the region are 206, 253, and 425, which are potential candidates to be included in the overlay complex upon exhaustion of central office codes.

History
Area code 564 was originally proposed and approved in 2000, but was not implemented until July 29, 2017. Initially, it was implemented as a concentrated overlay for the 360 area, comprising all of western Washington outside of the core of the Seattle/Tacoma metropolitan area. While it is to be extended to include other area codes in the region as they exhaust, its implementation has made ten-digit dialing mandatory in all of western Washington.

In 1999, area code 564 was proposed as an overlay of 360. This was slated for implementation on July 29, 2000. Later, the Washington Utilities and Transportation Commission (WUTC) determined that the actual increase in need for new numbers in 360 had fallen short of projections and so it postponed the overlay until at least February 2001.

In May 2000, the commission projected that the metropolitan Seattle area codes (206, 253, and 425) would also soon exhaust their number pools, and it expanded the 564 plan to include those areas as well. By the summer, however, that was determined not to be immediately necessary.  The overlay was then planned for application on October 20, 2001.

On August 22, 2001, the WUTC announced that increased efficiency in the reuse of the existing number pool meant that the immediate need for the new area code had subsided. Part of that was also attributed to a downturn in the telecommunications sector. The commission put off implementation until no earlier than October 20, 2002.

Since the development of the initial plan for the area code, the WUTC and the NANPA have rebuffed the telephone companies' request for a new area code and instead directed them to actively share and efficiently use the number blocks that had already been assigned. That refers mainly to the practice of number pooling, which allocates a single telephone exchange prefix in ten blocks of one thousand telephone numbers for more efficient allocation, rather than assigning a prefix's whole numbering space (10,000 numbers) to one carrier in the a single rate center.

The WUTC took further steps to decrease the need for new number blocks in 360 and 509 and head off the need for new area codes, including aggressive reclamation of unused and underused number blocks and exchanges. The introduction of mandatory local and wireless number portability (a prerequisite for number pooling) has also served to stem the demand for new numbers and thus new area codes.

According to the WUTC's estimate , the earliest projection for any Western Washington area code to be exhausted is 2018 for area code 360. The other codes are not expected to exhaust before 2025.

On July 29, 2017, ten-digit dialing became mandatory for all local calls in Western Washington. 
Until then, Seattle had been one of the few major American cities with seven-digit dialing. 
Since September 30, 2017, telephone numbers with the area code 564 have been issued in the existing number plan area 360.
Per NANPA determination, the overlay complex may be extended only when NPAs 206, 253, and 425 are nearing exhaustion. Exhaustion of area code 206 is expected for 2025.

References

External links

564
564